The 2010 National Pro Fastpitch season was the seventh season of professional softball under the name National Pro Fastpitch (NPF) for the only professional women's fastpitch softball league in the United States.  From 1997 to 2002, NPF operated under the names Women's Pro Fastpitch (WPF) and Women's Pro Softball League (WPSL). Each year, the playoff teams battle for the Cowles Cup.

Teams, cities and stadiums

Milestones and events
NPF announced the Rockford Thunder would not be playing in 2010 because ownership "failed to maintain NPF Team requirements to field a Team for the 2010 Season."  It was also announced that the league was adding a new team named the Tennessee Diamonds which would begin play in 2010 in Blount County, Tenn. and have first rights to players on the Thunder's roster.

Later it was revealed that the Diamonds would be moving operational headquarters from Alcoa, TN to Nashville, TN.  The Alcoa owners did not fund the team or comply with other contractual commitments made to NPF.  The team was operated by NPF in Nashville for 2010.

NPF revealed that the Philadelphia Force would not participate in the league when the 2010 schedule was released without the Force.

Player acquisition

College draft

The 2010 NPF Senior Draft was held February 10, 2010, at Heritage Key Resort in Kissimmee, Florida.  The NPF Draft was broadcast on MLB.com. USSSA Pride selected Charlotte Morgan of Alabama as the first overall pick.

Notable transactions
The USSSA Florida Pride traded Monica Abbott  and Shannon Doepking to the Tennessee Diamonds for Diamonds' pitcher Cat Osterman and Megan Willis.

Jennie Finch announced she would retire at the end of the season.

League standings 
Source

NPF Championship

The 2010 NPF Championship Series was held at McMurry Park in Sulphur, Louisiana August 26–29.  All four teams qualified and were seeded based on the final standings.  The first seed played the fourth seed on a best-of-three series, and the second seed played the third seed in another best-of-three series.  The winners played each other in a best-of-three series that determined the champion.

Championship Game

Annual awards
Source:

Award notes

See also 

 List of professional sports leagues
 List of professional sports teams in the United States and Canada

References

External links 
 

Softball teams
2010 in women's softball
2010 in American women's sports
Softball in the United States